"Ozymandias" is a poem published in 1818 by Percy Bysshe Shelley.

Ozymandias may also refer to:

People
 Ramesses II, pharaoh of Egypt, known as Ozymandias in Greek sources, on whom a number of poems are based
 Ozymandias (pianist) (born 1971), Swiss pianist

Arts and entertainment

Fictional characters and elements
 Ozymandias (Marvel Comics), a Marvel Comics character
 Ozymandias (Watchmen), a character from Watchmen comic book series, film, and television series
 Ozymandias, a character from John Christopher's The Tripods trilogy
 Ozymandias Justin Llewellyn, a character in the comic strip Ozy and Millie
 Ozymandias, a dæmon in the His Dark Materials trilogy by Philip Pullman
 Ozymandias "Oz" Mayfair-Richards, a character from American Horror Story: Cult
 Ozymandias, a character in James Patterson's 2003 novel The Lake House
 Ozymandias, an owl in the 1970s children's fantasy series Ace of Wands
 Ozymandias, the main starship in Dino Crisis 3

Music
 Qntal IV: Ozymandias, a 2005 album by Qntal
 "Ozymandias", a song by Brymo from the 2020 album Yellow 
 "Ozymandias", a song by Jefferson Starship from the 1976 album Spitfire
 "Ozymandias", a song by The Black League from the 2000 album Ichor 
 "Ozymandias", a song by The Guggenheim Grotto from the 2005 album ...Waltzing Alone 
 "Ozymandias", a song by The Sisters of Mercy, the b-side to their 1988 single "Dominion"
 "My Name Is Ozymandias", a song by Gatsby's American Dream from the 2006 eponymous album
“Ozymandias”, a song by Jean-Jacques Burnel

Other uses in arts and entertainment
 "Ozymandias" (Smith), an 1818 sonnet written by Horace Smith
 "Ozymandias" (short story), by Robert Silverberg, 1958
 "Ozymandias" (Breaking Bad), a 2013 episode of Breaking Bad
 "Ozymandias", an episode of the 1987 TV series Beauty and the Beast

See also
Ozymandias (fish), an extinct fish genus
Ophiodon ozymandias, an extinct fish species